Koçkaya is a quarter of the town of Yücebağ, Sason District, Batman Province, Turkey. The quarter is populated by Kurds of the Xiyan tribe and had a population of 700 in 2021.

References

Populated places in Sason District

Kurdish settlements in Batman Province